Malikah may refer to:

Malik
Malikah, Yemen
Malikah or Al-Nadirah, princess of Hatra

See also
Malik (disambiguation)